The Downtown Loop may refer to:

 Downtown Loop (Kansas City)
 Atlanta Streetcar

See also 
 Chicago Loop
 Delmar Loop, Missouri, U.S.